Allens Cross is an electoral ward of Birmingham City Council in the south west of Birmingham, West Midlands, covering an urban area immediately to the west of Northfield town centre. The ward was created in 2018 as a result of boundary changes that saw the number of wards in Birmingham increase from 40 to 69.

The ward was gained by Jack Deakin of The Labour Party in May 2022 by a slim majority of 14 votes from Eddie Freeman, the sitting Conservative councillor.

Politics
Allens Cross ward is currently represented on Birmingham City Council by Labour Co-op Councillor Jack Deakin since May 2022.

The ward was largely created from the former Weoley ward and is contained within the Birmingham Northfield constituency.

Elections since 2010

2020s

2010s

Notes

References 

Wards of Birmingham, West Midlands